Tolm may refer to:

Tolm., taxonomic author abbreviation for Alexandr Innokentevich Tolmatchew (1903–1979), Soviet botanist
Tolm, family name of the central characters of the 1979 Heinrich Böll novel, The Safety Net
Tolm, Scottish Gaelic name for the village of Holm, Lewis

See also
Tolm ja Tuul, 1993 novel by Eeva Park